The 1939 East Carolina Pirates football team was an American football team that represented East Carolina Teachers College (now known as East Carolina University) as an independent during the 1939 college football season. In their only season under head coach O. A. Hankner, the team compiled a 0–8 record.

Schedule

References

East Carolina
College football winless seasons
East Carolina Pirates football seasons
East Carolina Pirates football